The Volgograd Oblast Football Championship (Чемпионат Волгоградской области по футболу) is an independent soccer league for teams in the Volgograd Oblast region of southern Russia. The league is nominally at the fifth level of the Russian football system, but there is no automatic promotion and relegation between it and the fourth-level Amateur Football League. Teams from the Amateur Football League can apply to join the Volgograd Oblast Championship and vice versa.

The league is currently home to former professional teams FC Tekstilshchik Kamyshin and FC Olimpia Volgograd, and a reserve team from the area's biggest club Rotor Volgograd. Past winners include FC Zvezda Gorodishche, FC Avangard Kamyshin and FC Tsement Mikhaylovka.

Matches are played between April and October.

2015 final table

References 
 http://www.rsssf.com/tablesr/rus2013b.html#5volgo
 http://www.goalstream.org/season/1007678#/schedule-s2

Sport in Volgograd Oblast
Football leagues in Russia